Lei Tung is an underground MTR rapid transit station in Hong Kong on the eastern section of the , located beside Mount Johnston on Ap Lei Chau in Southern District. The station is named after the adjacent public housing estate of the same name, which it serves in addition to Ap Lei Chau Main Street. The station is located below Yue On Court and Lei Tung Estate, and opened on 28 December 2016 with the rest of the South Island line. It is the southernmost railway station in Hong Kong.

History
The station was built by the Leighton Contractors–John Holland Joint Venture under a contract numbered 904, awarded May 2011, which also included South Horizons station and sections of running tunnel. It was constructed using the drill-and-blast method.

Lei Tung station was opened on 28 December 2016.

Station layout

The station is underground with two tracks and an island platform. North of the station, the line rises onto Aberdeen Channel Bridge, a railway bridge designed by Atkins Global that spans the Aberdeen Channel.

Artworks in the station are Dawn of a New Day and Journeys Along the South Island Line (East) by local children under the respective leadership of Castaly Leung Ching-man and Sum Sum Tse. The art is located in the passageway to exit A, as well as the concourse and lift cars of exit B.

Entrances/exits 
Lei Tung station has three exits. The exit to Lei Tung Estate Bus Terminal is connected to the concourse by lifts instead of escalators, due to the  depth of the platforms. Passage from exit A to exit B does not require entering the paid area.
 A1: Ap Lei Chau Main Street (ground level) 
 A2: Ap Lei Chau Bridge Road (accessed by lift) 
 B: Lei Tung Estate, Lei Tung Commercial Centre, taxi stand, bus terminal (all entry/exit by 4 lifts)

References 

MTR stations on Hong Kong Island
South Island line
Ap Lei Chau